Big Brother 2015, also known as Big Brother 16 and Big Brother: Timebomb, was the sixteenth series of the British reality television series Big Brother, hosted by Emma Willis and narrated by Marcus Bentley. The series launched on Channel 5 in the United Kingdom and TV3 in the Republic of Ireland on 12 May 2015 and ended on 16 July 2015, a week earlier than planned. This was the earliest launch of a Big Brother series since the show's inception in 2000. It is the fifth regular series and the thirteenth series of Big Brother overall to air on Channel 5, and is the first regular series to air in May since Big Brother 8 in 2007. It is also the first series to air in Ireland since its move to Channel 5 in 2011. On 2 February 2015, it was revealed that Willis had stepped down as a host on the show's spin-off series Big Brother's Bit on the Side, though Rylan Clark will continue.

It is the first and only regular series to credit Denis O'Connor as creative director. On Day 17, Aaron Frew was ejected from the House after flashing fellow Housemate Joel Williams. It is the second series to feature returning housemates after Ultimate Big Brother with Nikki Grahame, Aisleyne Horgan Wallace, Brian Belo and Helen Wood taking part as long-term houseguests.

The series was won by Chloe Wilburn, who won the £116,100 prize fund, the largest prize money in Big Brother UK history. She also won an additional £5,000 during Cash Bomb Week.

Production 
The theme of the series was Timebomb, with show bosses explaining that "with Big Brother playing with the concept of time, the tasks, secret missions and twists promise to have tension, drama and intrigue. Time may be a friend or an enemy and for some it may well run out." Emma Willis teased the new theme, stating that "days will turn into nights, time will stop, rewind and tasks will get turned on their heads."

Eye Logo 
The official eye logo was unveiled by Channel 5 on 29 April 2015. The eye has a gold metallic structure with a pulsating centre, coinciding with the theme of the series. Lucozade became the new sponsor for the show having previously sponsored the programme on Channel 4 during the tenth series.

House 
The Big Brother house was totally revamped for the new series, developing a sophisticated and sleek 'Mad Men' 60s-style theme. Official house pictures were released on 5 May 2015. The kitchen was gold and had a 60's vibe to it; the living room was in the centre of the house and featured a large orange circular seating area to replicate the Big Brother eye; the bedroom was situated next to the living room and had four double beds and six single beds, and there was also a large dressing room and vanity mirror with a large table; the bathroom was coated in dark wood with a rocky glass shower and large bath with an aquatic wall; the garden went for a copper look with an outdoor seating area and a large glass door which leads into the main part of the house – the pool is also considerably larger than previous series', and is situated on its own island; the garden extends up a flight of stairs to a recreational 'sky room', similar to Big Brother 14's treehouse and Big Brother 15's pod.

Pictures of the diary room were unveiled on 11 May 2015, a day before the launch of the series. The egg-shaped chair has a red leather seating, cradled by a gold exterior. The wallpaper on either side of the room each resemble a clock face to replicate the interior of the Elizabeth Tower in London.

Housemates 

Ahead of the launch, on 7 May 2015 it was announced that the official list of Housemates would be released two days before the series begins. This was the first time that the Housemates entering was made public knowledge prior to the launch night; in previous series', the Housemates would be unveiled live on the night. Keeping with the Timebomb theme, a countdown began at 00:01 on 8 May 2015 on the official website. It ended two days later on 10 May, and the identities of fifteen Housemates were unveiled. 15 Housemates entered the House on Day 1. Three new housemates entered the house on Day 18.

House guests 
Following the eviction on Day 25, Willis revealed that former Housemates would be returning on Day 32 as part of "Time Warp" week, joining a fake-evicted Housemate in the "Secret Lair", also known as the "Timebomb Bunker" for 48 hours. The returning Housemates will then enter the main house on Day 34 as "House guests". As well as these three, a number of other faces from Big Brothers past will return to the House to take part in classic tasks and twists. On 12 June 2015, hours before the fake eviction, it was confirmed that Brian Belo, Helen Wood and Nikki Grahame would be re-entering the House. These three were originally meant to leave the House on Day 39 but Big Brother decided to extend their stay for an extra week. On Day 43, Brian voluntarily left the House by climbing over the garden wall. On Day 44, Aisleyne Horgan-Wallace entered the House as the fourth Time Warp Housemate. On Day 46, Helen and Nikki both left the House. Shortly after this, Emma revealed that more famous faces would return to stay in Big Brother's Hotel from Hell. These guests included John McCirick, Charley Uchea, Jasmine Lennard, James Jordan and Dexter Koh.

 Cash Bomb 
On 29 June 2015, it was confirmed that there would be a "Cash Bomb" twist for the penultimate week although exact details were not revealed. On Day 53, following Marc's eviction, Emma announced that as part of the twist, the £150,000 prize fund would be put at risk.

 Weekly summary 

 Nominations table 

Notes

: On launch night, the public voted for five housemates to participate in the series' first Timebomb challenge, fast-forwarding to the first eviction of the series. During the challenge, Jack won three immunity passes to use at any time during the series, Nick was forced to nominate face-to-face during every week of nominations, Jade won personal luxury, Adjoa received nothing and Simon was evicted immediately.
: As part of the first Timebomb twist on launch night, Nick was forced to nominate face-to-face during this week of nominations.
: This week the Housemates nominated face-to-face. Adjoa, Cristian, Eileen and Sarah received the most nominations. Jack was offered to give one of his immunity passes to one of the nominated housemates and he saved Cristian.
: As well as finding out that they were nominated, Aaron, Cristian, Eileen, Jade, Joel, and Nick were shown who nominated them. Jack declined to give one of his immunity passes to one of the nominated housemates. It was later revealed that the real nominees were the housemates who had received the fewest nominations: Amy & Sally, Chloe, Danny, Harriet, Jack, Kieran, and Sarah. Jack was offered to give one of his immunity passes to one of the nominated housemates. He saved himself. Amy & Sally, Harriet, Kieran and Sarah were evicted on Day 18, and were replaced by Harry Amelia, Marc, Sam and Simon.
: As new housemates, Harry Amelia, Marc, Sam and Simon were immune from the public vote this week. Two of the four new housemates, as chosen by an online poll, were solely responsible for nominating. The public chose Sam and Simon to nominate. As well as finding out that they were nominated, Eileen, Jack, and Joel were shown who nominated them. Jack, as one of the nominated housemates, was given the opportunity to use his final immunity pass. He chose to save himself from eviction.
: The Housemates nominated face-to-face on Day 27. This week the public voted to move a Housemate rather than to evict. The chosen Housemate would move into the 'Timebomb Bunker' and would be joined by three former Housemates for the upcoming Timewarp Week. The public chose to send Marc to the Bunker.
: This week Marc and the three former Housemates were the only Housemates able to nominate.
: This week is nomination tag. If a Housemate receives a nomination they are automatically put up for eviction, and will then have to choose another to join them. That Housemate then must select another, and so on. This began as Jade decided to nominate Cristian after her eviction. As the final Housemate to be nominated, Nick did not have to nominate anyone else, leaving Chloe safe from the public vote. As Time Warp Week was put on pause, Marc was immune from nominations.
: Aisleyne was required to nominate this week, she made her nominations face-to-face.
: This week was "Cash Bomb nominations". The Housemates had to win immunity and the ability to choose one other Housemate to face eviction by pressing a button whenever the prize fund started to decrease. Joel, Danny, Cristian and Sam pressed the button and nominated Sam, Harry Amelia, Nick and Jack respectively. The nominated Housemates then had to bid money from the prize fund with the highest bidder saving themselves and being replaced by Chloe, the only eligible Housemate. Nick placed the highest bid and saved himself from eviction.
: After Harry Amelia's eviction, the housemates were told that they had to evict a second housemate. The three remaining nominated housemates picked from one of three envelopes which had 1 of 3 amounts of money which would be added to the prize money in the event of the holders eviction. Jack had £1,000, Chloe had £10,000, Sam has £15,000. The house evicted Sam and £15,000 was added to the prize money.
: For the final week, the public were voting for the housemate they wanted to win', rather than evict. Following the first vote count, Cristian and Nick were evicted and left the house together.

Ratings 
Official ratings are taken from BARB.

References

External links 
 
 

16
2015 British television seasons
Channel 5 (British TV channel) reality television shows